Cordeirópolis is a municipality in São Paulo state, Brazil. The population is 24,826 (2020 est.) in an area of 138 km². Its elevation is 651 m.

References

Municipalities in São Paulo (state)